Kaluneerkulam is a village panchayat located in the Tirunelveli district of Tamil Nadu, India.

Geography 
The latitude 8.908222 and longitude 77.449022 are the geo-coordinates of the Kaluneerkulam.

Transport 
The nearest railway station to Kaluneerkulam is Tenkasi Jn which is located in and around 16.0 kilometer distance.

Kaluneerkulam's nearest airport is Tuticorin Airport situated at 66.8 km distance.

Education 
Kaluneerkulam nearest schools has been listed as follows.
மறவா நடுநிலை பள்ளி . Raja Middle School-0.1 km.
Anna Boy S High School-3.3 km.
T P S Govt Higher Secondary School-3.8 km.
Rathna Middle School-5.1 km.
Nadar Hindu High School-5.9 km.

References 

Villages in Tirunelveli district